Sami Tallberg (born 7 November 1976) is a Finnish award-winning chef, food writer and a pioneer in foraging since 2005. Tallberg is known especially for his wild food and mushrooms focused books, catering and courses as well as his concept design in the restaurant and food industry. Tallberg is based in Ruissalo, Finland but works in the culinary fields everywhere in the world.

Education 
Tallberg studied at Perho Helsinki Culinary School to become a restaurant chef between 1994 and 1997. He completed his Head Chef Degree in 2002 at Haaga-Perho Adult Education. The following year he also attained a WSET Level 3 award in wines, at the moment he's going for WSET Diploma.

Career in restaurants 
Tallberg started his career in the restaurant business at The Ivy, London where he worked as a chef from 1997 to 1999 learning from Mark Hix. His first job as a head chef was in London at the Rivington Grill Shoreditch, a restaurant and a deli, where he worked from 2002 until 2005. At the Rivington he gained experience working with the owners Mark Hix, Des McDonald and Ratnesh Bagdai, and first gained an interest in wild food through his work there with internationally renowned wild food expert Miles Irving.

In 2005 he started as an executive chef for the Lloyds TSB Commercial Finance/Compass Group being in charge of the directors’ dining and events at the headquarter. Tallberg was also responsible for the wine list, leading to an interest in bio-organic wines.

Tallberg returned to Finland in 2008 to work as an executive chef for the restaurant Carelia. 

After Carelia in 2011 he moved on to launch the five-star-hotel Kämp's new restaurant Kämp Signe, which specializes in Nordic wild food. At the same time he also worked at Tertin Kartano mansion during the summer seasons of 2010 to 2012, developing their menu and recipes as well as training the staff in tending the restaurant's garden and foraging.

Tallberg was also a head chef for NOMAD - a street food concept launched at FLOW festival in Helsinki in August 2013. Tallberg was also in charge of vegetarian and vegan restaurant Cargo Helsinki's concept, menu and recipes since early 2016.

Between 2016-2021 Tallberg worked as a concept and menu designer at Hotel Punkaharju, Finland, and an executive chef since early 2020.

Since early 2022 he has been running his concept restaurant ST X FDS in collaboration with Finnish Design Shop in Turku, Finland.

Career as an entrepreneur 
Since 2009 Tallberg has been a leading expert and consultant in Finnish wild food and foraging, specializing in Nordic cuisine, biohacker-proof food as well as new wave vegan food. He gives lectures, food talks, workshops and courses throughout the year. 

His foraging expertise covers areas from the cities of the UK and Finland to the countries within Boreal forest zone (Taiga). In 2022 Tallberg expanded his expertise to fynbos vegetation forming a base camp in Cape Town area. In his work Tallberg uses regularly 72 edible mushrooms and 122 wild plants with growing interest in not only recipes but also nutritional science, botany as well as history of botany. Tallberg's knowledge in the areas of nutrient dense and whole food likewise in personalized diets has taken Tallberg to guide brands and companies to create new product and services concepts in culinary fields.

Tallberg has been in charge of catering for bespoke events and parties, from small private gatherings to events for up to 1,500 people, in 20 countries around the world. In 2015 he catered to the Louis Vuitton Series 3 event in London together with restaurant Bistrotheque. He has also planned and produced each Upgraded Dinner held for Biohacker Summits during 2015–2022. In his Ruissalo site he runs private dining, foraging and cooking courses.

Tallberg has published several cook books, the most notable being the bestseller The Wild Herb Cookbook, published in 2011 (11th edition in 2022). He also blogs and writes regularly about wild food.

Awards and honours 

 Finland Prize 2012 - For developing a new and unique style of Finnish food through using ingredients of a wild nature (Finland Prize is awarded by Minister of Culture and Education in recognition of a significant career in arts, an exceptional artistic achievement, or a promising breakthrough.) as an only awarded chef.
 Design Award 2015 - Ruokateko 2015 by Muoto 2015
 Wild Food Ambassador 2012–2016 by the Elo Foundation, the foundation for the promotion of Finnish food culture
 Three pairs of cutlery on the Michelin guide for Kämp Signe 2012

Bibliography 
 Makuparit (Finnish) (2016)
 Vilda Örter Kokboken (2014) (Swedish)
 Wild, Weird and Wonderful (2013) (Finnish, English and Russian) 
 Villiyrttikeittokirja (7th edition out in March 2016) (Finnish)
 Hedelmäistä, with Janne Tarmio , 2013) (Finnish)
 Wild Herb Cookbook (2012) (English)
 Koivunmahlaa & kaviaaria, with Christer Lindgren (2012) (Finnish) 
 Mäti - Helmiä lautasella, with Janne Tarmio (2012) (Finnish)
 дикие и увлекательно
 Villiä Vegeä
 Villi City Vegaani
 Villisienikeittokirja
 Villisienet tunnistusopas
 Villiyrttikeittokirja 10. Painos
 Villiyrtit - Tunnistusopas

References

External links 
 

Finnish restaurateurs
Living people
1976 births
Finnish chefs
Finnish food writers
Foraging